, or , are supplementary Japanese schools located in foreign countries for students living abroad with their families. Hoshū jugyō kō educate Japanese-born children who attend local day schools. They generally operate on weekends, after school, and other times not during the hours of operation of the day schools.

The Ministry of Education, Science, Sports and Culture (Monbusho), as of 1985, encouraged the opening of hoshū jugyō kō in developed countries. It encouraged the development of full-time Japanese ("person", not "language") day schools, in Japanese nihonjin gakkō, in developing countries. In 1971, there were 22 supplementary Japanese schools worldwide. 

By May 1986, Japan operated 112 supplementary schools worldwide, having a total of 1,144 teachers, most of them Japanese nationals, and 15,086 students. The number of supplementary schools increased to 120 by 1987. As of April 15, 2010, there are 201 Japanese supplementary schools in 56 countries.

Operations

These schools, which usually hold classes on weekends, are primarily designed to serve the children of Japanese residents temporarily residing in foreign countries so that, upon returning to their home country, they can easily re-adapt to the Japanese educational system. As a consequence, students at these schools, whether they are Japanese nationals and/or permanent residents of the host country, are generally taught in the age-appropriate Japanese curriculum specified by the Ministry of Education, Culture, Sports, Science and Technology (MEXT). Article 26 of the Constitution of Japan guarantees compulsory education for Japanese children in grades one through nine, so many weekend schools opened to serve students in those grades. Some weekend schools also serve high school and preschool/kindergarten. Several Japanese weekend schools operate in facilities rented from other educational institutions.

The majority of the instruction is kokugo (Japanese language instruction). The remainder of the curriculum consists of other academic subjects, including mathematics, social studies, and sciences. In order to cover all of the material mandated by the government of Japan in a timely fashion, each school assigns a portion of the curriculum as homework, because it is not possible to cover all material during class hours. , author of "Japanese Community Schools: New Pedagogy for a Changing Population", stated in 2011 that the supplementary schools were dominated by "a monoglossic ideology of protecting the Japanese language from English".

The Japanese government sends full-time teachers to supplementary schools that offer lessons that are similar to those of nihonjin gakkō, and/or those which have student bodies of 100 students each or greater. The number of teachers sent depends upon the enrollment: one teacher is sent for a student enrollment of 100 or more, two for 200 or more students, three for 800 or more students, four for 1,200 or more students, and five for 1,600 or more students. MEXT also subsidizes those weekend schools that each have over 100 students.

North America

In North America, the hoshūkō are usually operated by the local Japanese communities. They are equivalent to hagwon in ethnic Korean communities and Chinese schools in ethnic Chinese communities. These Japanese schools primarily serve Japanese nationals from families temporarily in the United States, or kikokushijo, and second-generation Japanese Americans. The latter may be U.S. citizens or they may have dual U.S.-Japanese citizenship. Because few Japanese children with Japanese as a first language in North America attend full-time Japanese schools, the majority of these children receive their primary education in English, their second language. These supplementary schools exist to provide their Japanese-language education.

Rachel Endo of Hamline University, the author of "Realities, Rewards, and Risks of Heritage-Language Education: Perspectives from Japanese Immigrant Parents in a Midwestern Community", wrote that these schools "have rigorous academic expectations and structured content".

As of 2012 the most common education option for Japanese families resident in the United States, especially those living in major metropolitan areas, is to send children to American schools during the week and use weekend Japanese schools to supplement their education. As of 2007 there were 85 Japanese supplementary schools in the United States. Some 12,500 children of Japanese nationality living in the United States attended both Japanese weekend schools and American day schools. They make up more than 60% of the total number of children of Japanese nationality resident in the United States.

In the 1990s, weekend schools began creating keishōgo, or "heritage education", classes for permanent residents of the U.S. The administrators and teachers of each weekend school that offers "heritage classes" develop their own curriculum. In the years prior to 2012, there was an increase in the number of students who were permanent residents of the United States and did not plan to go back to Japan. Instead, they attended the schools "to maintain their ethnic identity". By that year, the majority of students in the Japanese weekend schools in the United States were permanent residents of the United States. Kano argued that the MEXT curriculum for many of these permanent residents is unnecessary and out of touch. 

United Kingdom
The MEXT has eight Saturday Japanese supplementary schools in operation in the UK. As of 2013, 2,392 Japanese children in Canterbury, Cardiff, Derby, Edinburgh (school is in Livingston), Leeds, London, Manchester (school is in Lymm), Sunderland (school is in Oxclose), and Telford attend these schools.

 - Morley, Erewash, Derbyshire
Japanese Saturday School in London
 - Cardiff
 - Located in Canterbury - Its time of establishment is August 2005
 - Lymm, Warrington, Cheshire
 — Leeds
 - Livingston (near Edinburgh), established in 1982
 - Stirchley, Telford
 - Oxclose, Tyne and Wear (near Newcastle-upon-Tyne)

Demographics

In 2003, 51.7% of pupils of Japanese nationality in North America attended both hoshūkō and local North American day schools.

As of 2013, in Asia 3.4% of children of Japanese nationality and speaking Japanese as a first language attend Japanese weekend schools in addition to their local schools. In North America that year, 45% of children of Japanese nationality and speaking Japanese as a first language attend Japanese weekend schools in addition to their local schools.

List of schools
See: List of hoshū jugyō kō

References
 Doerr, Musha Neriko (Brookdale Community College) and Kiri Lee (Lehigh University). "Contesting heritage: language, legitimacy, and schooling at a weekend Japanese-language school in the United States" (Archive). Language and Education. Vol. 23, No. 5, September 2009, 425–441.
 Note: p. 426 states that the "all the names in this article are aliases": It is a common practice in ethnography to use aliases for actual names in order to protect privacy of the students, parents, teachers, as well as the school.
 Kano, Naomi. "Japanese Community Schools: New Pedagogy for a Changing Population" (Chapter 6). In: García, Ofelia, Zeena Zakharia, and Bahar Otcu (editors). Bilingual Community Education and Multilingualism: Beyond Heritage Languages in a Global City (Volume 89 of Bilingual Education and Bilingualism). Multilingual Matters, 2012. , 9781847698001. START: p. 99.
 Mori, Yoshiko (森 美子 Mori Yoshiko; Georgetown University) and Toshiko M. Calder (カルダー淑子 Karudā Toshiko; Princeton Community Japanese Language School). "Bilingual Vocabulary Knowledge and Arrival Age Among Japanese Heritage Language Students at Hoshuukoo." Foreign Language Annals. American Council on the Teaching of Foreign Languages, Volume 46, Issue 2, pages 290–310, June 2013. First published online on 22 May 2013. DOI 10.1111/flan.12027.

Notes

Further reading

Articles available online
 Chinen, Kiyomi (知念 聖美; University of California, Irvine) and Richard G. Tucker (リチャード・G・タッカー; Carnegie Mellon University). "The Acquisition of Heritage Japanese Language in the United States : Relationship between Ethnic Identity and Hoshuu-jugyoko(Japanese Language Schools for Supplementary Studies)" (米国における継承日本語習得 : エスニックアイデンティティーと補習授業校との関係; Archive). 母語・継承語・バイリンガル教育(MHB)研究 (2), 82-104, 2006-03-31. 母語・継承語・バイリンガル教育(MHB)研究会. See profile at CiNii. See profile at Osaka University Knowledge Archive. Alternate link (Archive).
 Okumura, Minako (奥村 三菜子; University of Bonn and Japanische Schule Bonn e.V. (ボン日本語補習授業校)). "補習" (ドイツの日本語補習校幼児部における現状・実践・考察; Archive). 母語・継承語・バイリンガル教育(MHB)研究 (6), 80-95, 2010-03-31. Mother Tongue, Heritage Language, and Bilingual Education (MHB) Research Association (母語・継承語・バイリンガル教育研究会（MHB研究会）). See profile #1 and profile #2 at CiNii. See profile at Osaka University Knowledge Archive (OUKA; 大阪大学機関リポジトリ). Alternate link (Archive).
 Ozawa, Michimasa. (小澤 至賢; 国立特別支援教育総合研究所教育 Department of Educational Support (支援部)). "Situation of Support for Japanese Students with Disabilities in Full-day and Supplementary Schools for the Japanese in the Eastern United States" (アメリカ東部地区の日本人学校及び補習授業校における障害のある日本人児童生徒への支援状況 (<特集>米国における障害のある子どもへの教育的支援の実際; Archive). Special Needs Education of the World (世界の特別支援教育) 23, 43-55, 2009-03. National Institute of Special Needs Education (独立行政法人国立特別支援教育総合研究所). See profile at CiNii. English abstract available.
 Suzuki, Kazuyo (鈴木 一代; Faculty of Humanities (人間学部), Saitama Gakuen University). "Japanese Language and Culture Acquisition of Intercultural Children with Japanese Ancestry : From the Perspective of Teachers at Part-time Japanese Schools" (日系国際児の日本語・日本文化習得とその支援 : 補習授業校講師の視点から; Archive). Bulletin of Saitama Gakuen University (埼玉学園大学紀要). Faculty of Humanities 7, 103-113, 2007-12. Saitama Gakuen University. See profile at CiNii. English abstract available.
 奥村 三菜子. "補習授業校における国際児にとっての日本語教育のあり方を考える : ドイツの補習授業校での実践から (第31回日本言語文化学研究会) -- (発表要旨)" (Archive). 言語文化と日本語教育 (31), 82-85, 2006-06. お茶の水女子大学日本言語文化学研究会. See profile at CiNii. See profile at Ochanomizu University Teapot (Institutional Repository).
 横尾 俊 (国立特別支援教育総合研究所教育相談部). "平成20年度日本人学校及び補習授業校に対するアンケート結果について" (Archive). 国立特別支援教育総合研究所教育相談年報 30, 33-45, 2009-06. National Institute of Special Needs Education (独立行政法人国立特別支援教育総合研究所). See profile at CiNii.
 大浜 幾久子 (University of Tokyo). "補習" (Archive). Annual Convention of the Japanese Association of Educational Psychology (日本教育心理学会総会発表論文集) (22), 228-229, 1980-10-05. The Japanese Association of Educational Psychology (日本教育心理学会). See profile at CiNii.

Articles not available online
 峯本 伸一 (前ボストン補習授業校(Greater Boston Japanese Language School):奈良市教育委員会). 在外教育施設における指導実践記録 33, 197-200, 2010-12-24. Tokyo Gakugei University. See profile at CiNii.

Economy of Japan